Robbert de Greef (27 August 1991 – 25 April 2019) was a Dutch cyclist, who rode for . On 1 April 2019, de Greef suffered a cardiac arrest during the Omloop van de Braakman race. He died on 25 April 2019.

Major results
2016
 6th Dwars door de Vlaamse Ardennen
2017
 1st Kernen Omloop Echt-Susteren
2019
 2nd Ronde van Drenthe

References

External links

1991 births
2019 deaths
Dutch male cyclists
People from Geldrop
Cyclists from North Brabant
Cyclists who died while racing
20th-century Dutch people
21st-century Dutch people